The 2010 Pilot Pen Tennis was a tennis tournament played on outdoor hard courts. It was the 42nd edition of the Pilot Pen Tennis, and was part of the ATP World Tour 250 Series of the 2010 ATP World Tour, and of the Premier Series of the 2010 WTA Tour. It took place at the Cullman-Heyman Tennis Center in New Haven, Connecticut, United States, from August 23 through August 28, 2010. It was the last event on the 2010 US Open Series before the 2010 US Open.

ATP entrants

Seeds

 Seedings are based on the rankings of August 16, 2010.

Other entrants
The following players received wildcards into the singles main draw
  James Blake
  Taylor Dent
  Fernando González
  Donald Young

The following players received entry from the qualifying draw:
  Philip Bester
  Dustin Brown
  Teymuraz Gabashvili
  Mikhail Kukushkin

The following player received the lucky loser spot:
  Radek Štěpánek

WTA entrants

Seeds

 Seedings are based on the rankings of August 16, 2010.

Other entrants
The following players received wildcards into the singles main draw
  Elena Dementieva
  Nadia Petrova1
  Dinara Safina
  Samantha Stosur
  Ana Ivanovic

1 Nadia Petrova received the wildcard originally allocated to Ana Ivanovic after the latter withdrew from the tournament due to an ankle injury suffered at Cincinnati.

The following players received entry from the qualifying draw:
  Varvara Lepchenko
  Bethanie Mattek-Sands
  Anastasia Rodionova
  Elena Vesnina

The following player received the lucky loser spot:
  Dominika Cibulková

Finals

Men's singles

 Sergiy Stakhovsky defeated  Denis Istomin, 3–6, 6–3, 6–4.
It was Stakhovsky's 2nd title of the year and 4th of his career.

Women's singles

 Caroline Wozniacki defeated  Nadia Petrova 6–3, 3–6, 6–3.
It was Wozniacki's fourth title of the year, and the tenth of her career. It was her third consecutive win at the event, also winning in 2008 and 2009.

Men's doubles

 Robert Lindstedt /  Horia Tecău defeated  Rohan Bopanna /  Aisam-ul-Haq Qureshi, 6–4, 7–5.

Women's doubles

 Květa Peschke /  Katarina Srebotnik defeated  Bethanie Mattek-Sands /  Meghann Shaughnessy, 7–5, 6–0.

References

External links
Official website